Mount Lymburner is a mountain,  high, standing  west-northwest of Mount Weems near the north end of the Sentinel Range in the Ellsworth Mountains of Antarctica. It was discovered by Lincoln Ellsworth on his trans-Antarctic flight of November 23, 1935, and was named by the Advisory Committee on Antarctic Names for J.H. Lymburner, an assistant pilot on Ellsworth's expedition.

See also
 Mountains in Antarctica

References

Ellsworth Mountains
Mountains of Ellsworth Land